Dacryodes edulis is a fruit tree in the Burseraceae family native to Africa. Its various regional names include safou (Republic of the Congo, Democratic Republic of the Congo and Angola), plum (Cameroon), atanga (Equatorial Guinea and Gabon), ube, elumi (Nigeria), African pear, bush pear, African plum, nsafu, bush butter tree, or butterfruit.

Description

Dacryodes edulis is an evergreen tree attaining a height of 18–40 meters in the forest but not exceeding 12 meters in plantations. It has a relatively short trunk and a deep, dense crown. The bark is pale gray and rough with droplets of resin. The leaves are a compound with 5-8 pairs of leaflets. The upper surface of the leaves is glossy. The flowers are yellow and about 5 mm across. They are arranged in a large inflorescence. The fruit is an ellipsoidal drupe which varies in length from 4 to 12 cm. The skin of the fruit is dark blue or violet, whereas the flesh is pale to light green. The tree flowers at the beginning of the rainy season and bears fruits during 2 to 5 months after flowering.
There are two variants of Dacryodes edulis: D. e. var. edulis and D. e. var. parvicarpa. The fruit of D. e. var. edulis is larger and the tree has stout, ascending branches. D. e. var. parvicarpa has smaller fruit and slender, drooping branches.

Habitat and ranges

The preferential habitat of D. edulis (Safou)is a shady, humid tropical forest. However, it adapts well to variations in soil type, humidity, temperature and day length. The natural range extends from Angola in the South, Nigeria and Sierra Leone in the West and Uganda in the East. It is also cultivated in Malaysia.

Oil composition from fruits of two cultivars of African pear in Cameroon

The oil of fruits of D. edulis is a rich source of fatty acids and triglycerides. The fatty acid compositions of fruit pulp oil of 2 cultivars of D. edulis (cultivars 1 and 2, grown in Cameroon) were determined. Fruits significantly differed in mass, length, thickness of pulp and mass of kernel, but contained similar amounts of oil (64.7 and 62% in cultivars 1 and 2, respectively, with ratios of oil:fruit of 1.4 and 1.54, respectively). The fatty acids (palmitic, oleic, stearic, linolenic and linoleic acids) and triglycerides compositions of oils of both cultivars were similar (although cultivar 1 was richer in palmitolino-olein (18.5 compared with 14.1%) and cultivar 2 was richer in dipalmito-olein (24.6 compared with 16.2%)).

Uses
D. edulis  has potential to improve nutrition, boost food security, foster rural development and support sustainable landcare.

Fruit
The main use of D. edulis is its fruit, which can be eaten either raw, cooked in salt water or roasted. Cooked flesh of the fruit has a texture similar to butter and is often eaten on bread. The pulp contains 48% oil and a plantation can produce 7-8 tons of oil per hectare. The fat content of this fruit is much higher compared to fruits such as apple, guava, and pawpaw. It is also rich in vitamins. The kernel can be used as fodder for sheep or goats. The flowers are useful in apiculture.

Timber
The wood of D. edulis is elastic, greyish-white to pinkish. The wood has general use for tool handles, and occasionally for mortars, and is suitable for carpentry.

Seed
The seed of Dacryodes edulis is rich in different proportion of carbohydrates, proteins, crude fibres, appreciable amounts of potassium, calcium, magnesium and phosphorus. It is also rich in essential amino acids such as Lysine, Phenylalanine, Leucine, Isoleucine. It contain a considerable amount of fatty acids such as palmitic acids, oleic acids, and linoleic acids.
Physicochemical analysis suggested that the seed have valuable functional attributes of industrial interest. The important natural product, gallic acid, is found in significant quantity in the seed of Dacryodes edulis. The vasomodulatory properties of the seeds have been reported.

Medicinal uses
The tree is also a source of many herbal medicines. It has long been used in the traditional medicine of some African countries to treat various ailments such as wounds, skin diseases, dysentery, and fever. The extracts and secondary metabolites have been found to show antimicrobial and antioxidant activities.  A wide range of chemical constituents such as terpenes, flavonoids, tannins, alkaloids, and saponins have been isolated from the plant.

Other uses
The resin is sometimes burnt for lighting or used as a glue. The tree is used as an ornamental plant and is known to improve soil quality by providing large quantities of biomass.

Nomenclature

The name of the genus comes from the Greek word for tear, dakruon. This is a reference to the resin droplets on bark surface of its members. The species name edulis means edible.

References

External links
 Safou. International Centre for Underutilised Crops, Southampton, UK. Factsheet No. 3
 

edulis
Fruits originating in Africa
Flora of West-Central Tropical Africa
Flora of Nigeria
Trees of Angola
Flora of Zambia
Plants used in traditional African medicine
Tropical fruit